Nemanja Bosančić (born 1 March 1995) is a Serbian professional footballer who plays as a midfielder for Dalian Professional in the Chinese Super League.

Club career

Early career
Bosančić started his career at FK Inđija. In 2018, he shortly joined Montenegrin club FK Berane, then returned to Inđija. In 2020, he moved to FK Kolubara.

In 2021, he transferred to FC Struga, where he played in the UEFA Europa Conference League qualification round.

Outside the Balkans
In July 2022, Bosančić joined Finnish club FC Lahti. He played only 4 matches in the Finnish top-tier league Veikkausliiga before moving to the far east.

In August 2022, he signed with Chinese Super League side Dalian Professional.

Career statistics 
Statistics accurate as of match played 31 December 2022.

References

External links
 

1995 births
Living people
Serbian footballers
Sportspeople from Pristina
Association football midfielders
FK Inđija players
FK Borac Čačak players
FK Berane players
FC Lahti players
FK Kolubara players
FC Struga players
Dalian Professional F.C. players